Samata may refer to:

People with the given name
Samata Das, Bengali actor
Samata (fashion entrepreneur), British-born Ghanaian fashion entrepreneur and journalist
Samata Sakuma, general in the Imperial Japanese Army, and the 5th Governor-General of Taiwan
Samatam Kistaya, poet, historian and ayurvedic doctor

Places
Samata Nagar, a suburb of Mumbai, India
Samata-i-Tai, a village on Savai'i in Samoa
Samata-i-Uta, a village on Savai'i in Samoa
Samatan, a commune in Gers, France
Samatata, a kingdom in ancient Bengal
Samatau, a village on the island of Upolu in Samoa

Political Parties
Samata Party, a political party in India
Rashtriya Lok Samata Party, a political party in India
Samata Samaj Party, a political party in India
Samata Kranti Dal, a political party in India

Other uses
Samata (NGO), an India-based non-governmental organization 
Samata Express, a superfast train near New Delhi, India

See also
Samata's Muse, a designer clothing label based in London
Samatali (disambiguation)
Samatar v. Yousuf, a case decided by the Supreme Court of the United States
Samta (disambiguation)